Waipaoa is a genus of sea snails, marine gastropod mollusks in the family Cancellariidae, the nutmeg snails.

Species
Species within the genus Waipaoa include:

 Waipaoa marwicki Dell, 1956

References

Cancellariidae
Monotypic gastropod genera